Sostrata is a genus of skippers in the family Hesperiidae.

Species
Recognised species in the genus Sostrata include:
 Sostrata bifasciata (Ménétriés, 1829)
 Sostrata nordica Evans, [1953]
 Sostrata pusilla Godman & Salvin, 1895

Former species
Sostrata adamantinus Mabille, 1898 - transferred to Festivia adamantinus (Mabille, 1898)
Sostrata caerulans Mabille and Boullet, 1917 - transferred to Festivia caerulans (Mabille and Boullet, 1917)
Sostrata cronion C and R. Felder, 1867 - transferred to Festivia cronion (C and R. Felder, 1867)
Sostrata festiva Erichson, [1849] - transferred to Festivia festiva (Erichson, [1849])
Sostrata grippa Evans, 1953 - transferred to Festivia grippa (Evans, 1953)
Sostrata jinna Evans, 1953 - transferred to Festivia jinna (Evans, 1953)

References

Natural History Museum Lepidoptera genus database

Erynnini
Hesperiidae genera
Taxa named by Frederick DuCane Godman
Taxa named by Osbert Salvin